The 1948 North Carolina A&T Aggies football team was an American football team that represented the North Carolina A&T State University as a member of the Colored Intercollegiate Athletic Association (CIAA) during the 1948 college football season. In their third season under head coach William M. Bell, the Aggies finished the season with an overall record of 4–4–1 and 4–2–1 in conference playing, placing fourth in the CIAA.

Schedule

References

North Carolina AandT
North Carolina A&T Aggies football seasons
North Carolina AandT football